Hoe is a village and former civil parish, now in the parish of Hoe and Worthing, situated in Norfolk. For local government purposes it falls within the Elmham and Mattishall Division of Norfolk County Council and the Lincoln Ward of Breckland District Council.

 
It is served by St Andrew's Church in the Dereham and District Team Ministry Benefice. The nave was rebuilt in 1794 and the chancel in 1820.

Governance 
On 1 April 1935 the parish of Worthing was merged with Hoe, although the ecclesiastical parishes remain separate. On 1 January 2022 the merged parish was renamed "Hoe & Worthing".  In 1931 the parish (prior to the merge) had a population of 151.

History
The villages name means 'Hill-spur'.

According to Vol. 2 of "A General History of Norfolk" printed by John Stacy in 1829. "Hoe belonged to the abbey of Ely, founded by St. Audrey or Etheldra, and was held by Ralph son of Ivo, of the abbot, and afterwards by the king, as appears from Domesday book; to which belonged a chapel with nave, a north and south aisle, a square tower, and three bells. The parish was inclosed in 1811".

The Mid-Norfolk Railway has extended its heritage services to Hoe and Worthing. The railway has produced plans for the construction of a platform at Hoe, although at present it is focusing on extending the line to County School railway station, rather than establishing the new platform at Hoe.

References

http://kepn.nottingham.ac.uk/map/place/Norfolk/Hoe

External links

 http://www.hoeandworthingarchive.org.uk
 http://www.hoeandworthing.co.uk/

Villages in Norfolk
Breckland District
Former civil parishes in Norfolk